Due sul pianerottolo is a 1976 Italian comedy film written and directed by Mario Amendola. It is based on a successful comedy play with the same name starred by the same cast.

Cast 

 Erminio Macario: Prof. Luigi Savoia 
 Rita Pavone: Guglielmina 'Mimma' Castigliano 
 Margherita Fumero:  Margherita Boccioni Stagno 
 Gianni Agus: Dr. Gianni Tagliolini 
 Mario Carotenuto:  Vespasiano Baudolino 
 Enzo Liberti: Brigadiere Icardi 
 Franco Agostini: Ettore Baudolino
 Renzo Marignano  
 Luca Sportelli

See also    
 List of Italian films of 1976

References

External links

1976 films
Italian comedy films
Films directed by Mario Amendola
1976 comedy films
Films scored by Guido & Maurizio De Angelis
1970s Italian films